Pierre Monbeig (15 September 1908 in Marissel – 22 September 1987 in Cavalaire) was a French geographer.

Biography 

Firstly Monbeig was professor in the lyceum Malherbe de Caen in 1931. In the year of 1935 he take the position of professor of physical and human Geography  in the University of São Paulo (USP), in Brazil. Later he was president of the Brazilian Geographers Association and participate in the Brazilian Conselho Nacional de Geografia. He stayed in São Paulo till 1946. Today the University of São Paulo have a chair with his name for the study of contemporaneous Brazilian Geography.

In 1947 he returned to France and researched in French National Centre for Scientific Research (CNRS). After that he taught at the University of Strasbourg, simultaneously with the post in Paris.

In 1957 he became a position as professor of economic geography in the Conservatoire National des Arts et Métiers (CNAM) and found the Institut des hautes études d'Amérique latine in 1957. Subsequently, in the year of 1961 he teaches at the University of Paris (Pantheon-Sorbonne University) and became director of the department of human sciences in the CNRS. In 1963, the University of Sao Paulo awarded him an honorary doctorate. He retired in 1977.

Works 

 Pierre Monbeig, Ensaios de geografia humana brasileira, São Paulo, Livraria Martins, 1940, 294 p.
 Pierre Monbeig, La Crise des sciences de l’homme, Rio de Janeiro, Casa do Estudante do Brasil, 1943, 64 p.
 Pierre Monbeig, Pionniers et planteurs de l’État de São Paulo, Paris, Librairie Armand Colin, 1952, 376 p.
 Pierre Monbeig, La Croissance de la ville de São Paulo », Revue de géographie alpine, 1953.
 Pierre Monbeig, Le Brésil, Paris, PUF, coll. Que sais-je?, 1954.
 Pierre Monbeig, 1957 - Novos Estudos de Geografia Humana Brasileira, São Paulo, Difusão Européia do Livro, 1957, 248 p.
 Pierre Monbeig, 1984 - Pioneiros e fazendeiros de São Paulo, São Paulo, Editora Hucitec/ Polis, 1984, 392 p.

References 
 Hervé Théry, Martine Droulers, Pierre Monbeig, un géographe pionnier, Paris, IHEAL, coll. « Travaux et Mémoires », 1991

Specific

External links 
Page consacrée à Pierre Monbeig Cybergeo

1908 births
1987 deaths
French geographers
Lycée Louis-le-Grand alumni
Academic staff of the University of Strasbourg
Academic staff of the University of São Paulo
Brazilianists
20th-century geographers